Apartment No. 13 is a 1991 film by the Iranian director Yadollah Samadi. It was written by Hassan Gholizadeh and Ali Reza Khamseh, and starred Ebrahim Abadi, Akbar Doodkar and Jamshid Esmailkhani. It won the Crystal Simorgh for best film.

References

Iranian comedy-drama films
1991 films
Crystal Simorgh for Best Film winners
1990s Persian-language films
Films whose writer won the Best Screenplay Crystal Simorgh